Mohamed Assaghir (also spelled Mohammed, born 27 May 1993) is a Moroccan boxer. He competed in the men's light heavyweight event at the 2020 Summer Olympics.

References

External links

 
 

 

1993 births
Living people
Moroccan male boxers
Olympic boxers of Morocco
Boxers at the 2020 Summer Olympics
African Games competitors for Morocco
Competitors at the 2019 African Games
Mediterranean Games competitors for Morocco
Competitors at the 2018 Mediterranean Games
Competitors at the 2022 Mediterranean Games
21st-century Moroccan people